Onward or onwards may refer to:

Entertainment

Film
 Onward (film), an animated Pixar film released in 2020

Music
"Onward" (1978 Yes song), from the 1978 album Tormato by the British band Yes
"Onwards", a song by the Afro Celt Sound System from the 2001 album Volume 3: Further in Time
Onwards (album), 2006, by the Norwegian band Triosphere
"Onwards!", a 2010 song from the fifth series of Doctor Who.
Onward (album), 2012, by the British band Hawkwind
Onward Brass Band, the name of two orchestras in New Orleans

Places
Onward, Indiana, a town in the United States
Onward, Mississippi, an unincorporated community in the United States

Vehicles
, U.S.Navy ship name
, clipper ship, served as US Navy ship in the Civil War
, WWI patrol yacht
, WWI patrol motorboat
Onward (locomotive), a steam locomotive with polygonal driving wheels
Onward (sternwheeler 1858), a steamboat on the Willamette River
Onward (sternwheeler 1867), a steamboat on the Tualatin River

Other uses
 En Marche!, political movement founded by Emmanuel Macron, President of France, frequently called "Onwards!" in English.
Onward (housing association)

See also